Bougouni Cercle is an administrative subdivision of the Sikasso Region of Mali. The administrative center (chef-lieu) is the town of Bougouni.

The cercle is divided into 26 communes:

References

Cercles of Mali
Sikasso Region